Værøya or Værøy is an island in Værøy Municipality in Nordland county, Norway.  The  island makes up about 89% of the land area of the whole municipality and it is home to 100% of the municipal residents.

Name
The Old Norse form of the name was Veðrøy. The first element is veðr which means "weather" (here referring to harsh weather and the exposed and unsheltered position of the island). The last element is øy which means "island".  Historically, the name has been spelled Værø.

Geography
The island lies at the southern of the Lofoten archipelago, between the islands of Røstlandet and Moskenesøya. The small, uninhabited island of Mosken lies a short distance north of Værøya. The Moskenstraumen strait lies to the north of the island, the Vestfjorden lies to the east, and the Norwegian Sea is to the west.

The island has two villages on it:  Nordland (on the northern edge of the island) and Sørland (on the southeastern peninsula).  About 95% of the island's residents live in Sørland, which is also the administrative centre of the municipality. There is also the old (now abandoned) village of Mostad on the southern part of the island.  The Værøy Church and Old Værøy Church are both located on the island.

History
The Norwegian Lundehund was a dog used in Værøy to hunt puffins on the narrow cliffs on the island.  The dog breed nearly went extinct in the 20th century, but a few dogs remained and the breed has since made a comeback.

Important Bird Area
An 840 ha area consisting of vertical cliffs and steep grassy slopes on the south-west peninsula of the island, along with the Måstadfjellet nature reserve and adjacent marine waters, has been designated an Important Bird Area (IBA) by BirdLife International because it supports large breeding colonies of about 40,000 pairs of Atlantic puffins and 15–20,000 pairs of black-legged kittiwakes.

Media gallery

See also
List of islands of Norway

References

Islands of Nordland
Værøy
Nature reserves in Norway
Important Bird Areas of Norway
Important Bird Areas of Arctic islands
Seabird colonies